Lucas Valeriu Ntuba Radebe OIS (born 12 April 1969) is a South African former professional footballer who played as a centre back.

He began playing in South Africa with Kaizer Chiefs, before transferring to Leeds United, where he played 256 matches for the Yorkshire side. During his spells at these clubs, he picked up the nicknames "Rhoo" and "The Chief". He became captain of Leeds United and also of the South African national team, most notably at World Cup 2002. Nelson Mandela said of Radebe: "This is my hero." He also captained Kaizer Chiefs during his time at Chiefs.

Early life
Radebe was born to Emily and Johannes Radebe in the Diepkloof section of Soweto, near Johannesburg, as one of 11 children. He attended the local Bopasenatla Secondary School until he was 15 years old. His parents sent him to one of the former homelands in Grade 10, Bophuthatswana, as a way to keep him safe from the violent neighbourhood of Diepkloof Zone Four in Soweto. There he attended Ngotwane High School near Zeerust.

Club career

Kaizer Chiefs
After playing for amateur side ICL Birds in the now-defunct Bophuthatswana Soccer League, and was spotted by Patrick Ntsoelengoe who recruited him to one of South Africa's top clubs, the Kaizer Chiefs, in 1989. Radebe originally started his career with the Kaizer Chiefs as a goalkeeper, and then switched positions to central midfield and then finally to central defence.

Leeds United
In 1994, Radebe and another South African player, Philemon "Chippa" Masinga, moved to Leeds United for a transfer fee of £250,000. Radebe was only included in the deal to keep Masinga happy; as it turned out, he became the more valuable investment.

Initially the move was not a success; Radebe did not agree with then Leeds manager Howard Wilkinson, and suffered injuries which prevented him for earning a regular first team place.

Radebe returned to the goalkeeper position in March 1996, replacing John Lukic in the position after he suffered an injury in the second half of a defeat to Middlesbrough. Radebe would again play in the goalkeeper position the following month when goalkeeper Mark Beeney was sent off for handling the ball outside his area in the 17th minute against Manchester United. Radebe was brought on as a substitute in place of Mark Ford, and despite Leeds losing 1–0, Radebe earned 'cult-hero' status at the club due to his performance.

However, when Wilkinson was replaced by George Graham, his career flourished and Radebe was made captain of the team for the 1998–99 season. Whilst he was captain, Leeds enjoyed a period of relative success; in the 1998–99 season, they finished fourth in the FA Premier League, qualifying for the UEFA Cup. During the 1999–2000 season, Leeds finished third in the Premier League and qualified for the following season's Champions League, where they eventually reached the semi-finals. During this time, Radebe turned down the chance to move to Manchester United, A.C. Milan and Roma. Alex Ferguson commented at the time, "Everyone should be interested in Lucas."

In 2000, he was awarded the FIFA Fair Play Award.

However, in 2000 Radebe sustained serious knee and ankle injuries, which kept him out of the game for almost two years, and subsequently found it difficult to regain his form and his place in the team.

International career
Following the end of apartheid, Radebe made his debut for South African national team in their first international match on 7 July 1992 against Cameroon.

Having recently recovered from a long-term knee injury, he was a member of the South African team that won the 1996 African Cup of Nations.

Radebe was also the captain of the South African national football team during both the 1998 FIFA World Cup and the 2002 FIFA World Cup. South Africa failed to reach the knockout stages on both occasions; however Radebe did get on the score sheet in 2002.

He earned 70 caps for South Africa and scored two goals during his international career, with his last match being against England on 22 May 2003.

After retiring, Radebe was influential in South Africa's successful bid to host the 2010 World Cup. He could also be seen working as a pundit for South African television, and during ITV's coverage of the tournament.

Style of play
Thebe Mabanga, a Mail & Guardian journalist, wrote that South African fans remember Radebe in his Kaizer Chiefs days as "a lanky, flamboyant central midfielder who switched to central defence with ease, snuffing out any opposition threat with exquisite, acrobatic scissor kicks and diving headers, and man-marking the most lethal strikers into silence".

Post-playing career

At the end of the 2005 season, Radebe retired from professional football. Leeds held a testimonial for Radebe at Elland Road on 2 May 2005 attended by a crowd of over 37,886. Radebe also held a retirement match in Durban, South Africa between a South African Invitation XI and Lucas Radebe All Stars at Kings Park Soccer Stadium. The proceeds from both of these matches were combined with other money raised and donated to charity.

On 28 August 2006, Radebe announced that he was going back to Leeds after failing to secure a job with the World Cup hosts to be involved in the set-up of Bafana Bafana. He said he was "tired of waiting for unreliable people" who had allegedly promised him a role in the national team set up as the South African Football Association prepared to host the next World Cup in 2010.

In 2008, a local Leeds brewery asked for suggestions for a new beer; the most popular suggestion was Radebeer, showing the Leeds fans' admiration of Radebe.

On 8 October 2009, The English Football Association announced Radebe as an ambassador to help boost the 2018 World Cup bid.

A biography, Lucas: From the Streets of Soweto to Soccer Superstar by Richard Coomber was published in 2010.

In May 2010 he won the PFA Merit Award for his contribution to football.

During the FIFA 2010 World Cup, Radebe was a pundit for ITV's match coverage and also a columnist for The Daily Telegraph.

Radebe revealed in September 2010 that he would like to manage Leeds United in the future and also manage the South African national side. He said both jobs were the only coaching jobs that he would consider. In July 2012, it was announced that Radebe had accepted a position as team manager with the South African national side.

In October 2013, Radebe announced that he was set for another emotional return to the Elland Road ground at Leeds, to be presented to the crowd on Sunday, 30 October 2013.

On 23 January, it was confirmed that Boxer Josh Warrington would fight IBF world champion Lee Selby (26-1) in his first world title fight on 19 May at Elland Road with Radebe joining Warrington for the ringwalk. On 19 May, Warrington secured a split-decision victory over Selby to claim the title. With Radebe as part of Warrington's ringwalk and band Kaiser Chiefs also played songs at the event.

Personal life
In 1991, he was shot whilst driving with his brother Lazarus to buy drinks for his mother but was not critically wounded. When Leeds United confirmed their interest in 1994, Radebe's decision influenced in part by an incident that had taken place three years previously.
Radebe was shopping for his mother, accompanied by his brothers, one of his sisters and her baby. While walking, they heard a gunshot, but didn't pay it much attention because, says Radebe: "In Soweto you heard shots all the time". He felt a pain in his back and he was bleeding, and his left leg went limp. 
Radebe was rushed to hospital but nothing vital had been damaged. The bullet had entered his back and exited halfway down his thigh. The culprit is still unknown, it is suspected that someone was hired to shoot him rather than allow him to switch clubs.

He was voted 54th in the Top 100 Great South Africans in 2004.

His wife Feziwe died of cancer in October 2008. In December 2008, Radebe was treated for a heart complaint after collapsing while at the gym. Radebe married his second wife at the end of 2015.

Legacy
Kaiser Chiefs, a British indie/britpop band, whose members are all Leeds United supporters, chose this name because Radebe is a former player of Kaizer Chiefs.

Radebe has been an ambassador of FIFA for SOS Children's Villages; he also received the FIFA Fair Play Award in December 2000 for his contribution in ridding soccer of racism as well as for his work with children in South Africa.

In April 2003, for recognition of his efforts both on an off the field, Radebe was given the Contribution to the Community Award in the Premier League 10 Seasons Awards.

On an official visit to Leeds, Nelson Mandela said of Radebe: "This is my hero."

Career statistics

Sources: Soccerbase
lucasradebe.com

 More detailed statistics for Kaizer Chiefs games for this period are not available.
 "Continental" includes UEFA Cup and Champions League appearances.

International

Scores and results list South Africa's goal tally first.

Honours
South Africa
African Cup of Nations: 1996

Kaizer Chiefs
Champions (3) - record: 1989, 1991, 1992

References

Further reading
 Graeme Friedman Madiba's Boys: The Stories of Lucas Radebe and Mark Fish Comerford & Miller, United Kingdom . Foreword by Nelson Mandela

External links

 
 A short documentary following Lucas back to his home town in Umlazi Township

1969 births
Living people
1996 African Cup of Nations players
1998 African Cup of Nations players
2000 African Cup of Nations players
1997 FIFA Confederations Cup players
1998 FIFA World Cup players
2002 FIFA World Cup players
Kaizer Chiefs F.C. players
Leeds United F.C. players
Sportspeople from Soweto
Premier League players
Expatriate footballers in England
South African soccer players
South Africa international soccer players
South African expatriate soccer players
Shooting survivors
Association football defenders
Recipients of the Order of Ikhamanga
Outfield association footballers who played in goal
Soccer players from Gauteng